Randstad India is a division of Dutch-based Randstad Holding NV, a  Dutch multinational human resource consulting firm headquartered in Diemen, the Netherlands.

History

Ma Foi Management Consultants: 1992–2010
Randstad India started in 1992 as Ma Foi Management Consultants Ltd, a Chennai-based HR service provider founded by K. Pandiarajan along with his wife.

In 2004, Dutch headhunting firm Vedior NV acquired Ma Foi Management Consultants to develop its business in Southeast Asia and West Asia. In 2005, Ma Foi merged its consulting and outsourcing businesses to form a separate subsidiary, Ma Foi Consulting Solutions Ltd, which was acquired by ADP, Inc. in January 2012.

Transition to Randstad India: 2005–present
Randstad entered India in 2005/2006, with back-to-back acquisitions of two Indian recruitment companies – 'EmmayHR' and 'Teams4U' – 

In December 2007, Randstad Holding NV acquired the operations of Ma Foi, through its $5.14 billion acquisition of Vedior. By 2010, Randstad consolidated its Indian operations as the "Ma Foi Randstad" brand, by integrating the businesses of EmmayHR and Teams4U with Ma Foi. Finally in April 2012, "Randstad India" brand replaced Ma Foi Randstad. In February 2015, Randstad India converted into a Private Limited Company. In October of that year, its Sri Lankan arm was acquired by Quess Corp.

Activities
Randstad specializes in temporary and contract staffing, and the related recruitment and selection are traditionally the firm's core activities. It offers these services through a network of branches in towns and cities Besides regular staffing services for temporary and permanent jobs, as well as temporary and contract staffing of professionals and senior managers, Randstad also offers HR services and supplies.

References

Randstad NV
Financial services companies based in Chennai
Consulting firms established in 1992
Executive search firms
Employment agencies of India
Temporary employment agencies
1992 establishments in Tamil Nadu
Indian companies established in 1992